The 1st Arkansas Colored Light Artillery Battery was an artillery battery that served in the Union Army during the American Civil War. The regiment was composed of African American enlisted men commanded by white officers and was authorized by the Bureau of Colored Troops which was created by the United States War Department on May 22, 1863.

Organization

The 1st Arkansas Colored Light Artillery Battery was organized at Pine Bluff, Arkansas, on June 4, 1864.  Then unit was re-designated as Battery "H", 2nd U.S. Colored Light Artillery on December 13, 1864.  Mustered out on August 10, 1865.

Service
The battery was assigned to garrison duty at Pine Bluff, Ark. 7th Army Corps, Dept. of Arkansas, till December, 1864. The battery saw action at Prior Creek on September 18, 1864. The battery was involved in the Expedition to Mount Elba, Ark., and the skirmish at Saline River, January 22-February 4, 1865.

Mustered out of service
Mustered out on August 10, 1865.

See also

 List of Arkansas Civil War Union units
List of United States Colored Troops Civil War Units
United States Colored Troops
 Arkansas in the American Civil War

Notes

References

External links
 The Civil War Archive
 Encyclopedia of Arkansas History
 Edward G. Gerdes Civil War Home Page
 The War of the Rebellion: a Compilation of the Official Records of the Union and Confederate Armies
 The Arkansas History Commission, State Archives, Civil War in Arkansas
 
 https://www.nps.gov/parkhistory/online_books/civil_war_series/2/sec18.htm

Light Artillery
Units and formations of the Union Army from Arkansas
1865 disestablishments in Arkansas
Military units and formations established in 1864
1864 establishments in Arkansas
Artillery units and formations of the American Civil War
Military units and formations disestablished in 1865